MS Princess of Tasmania was an Australian-built roll-on/roll-off passenger ship. She was built by the State Dockyard in Newcastle, New South Wales for the Australian National Line. Laid down on 15 November 1957, she was launched on 15 December 1958. Up to 334 passengers and 142 vehicles could be carried. The ship was the first RO/RO passenger ship in the southern hemisphere, and at the time of launch, the largest vessel built in Australia.

Princess of Tasmania sailed on her maiden voyage on 23 September 1959. On entering service, she was used on the Devonport to Melbourne route across Bass Strait. The ship continued operating until 1972, when replaced by the Empress of Australia. She was sold to Bahamarine Ltd, then to the Canadian Ministry Of Transport later that year. In 1975, she was renamed Marine Cruiser. Two years later, the ship was sold to Rideau Shipping Co Ltd, which operated her until 1984.

Over the course of 1984, the ship was renamed twice (Majorca Rose, then Equator) and changed hands three times (to Dolphin International Shipping, then Equator Shipping Co Ltd, then Comeret). In 1985, the ship came into the ownership of Adriatic Ferries, and was renamed Adriatic Star. Three years later she was sold to Traghetti delle Isole and renamed Lampedusa.

Traghetti continued to operate her until 1991, when she was acquired by Fayez Trading & Shipping under the name Shahd Fayez. A year later, the ship was sold to Al Mahar Marine Co and renamed Al Mahrousa. Al Maher owned the ship until 2000, when she was sold to Nouran Navigation and named Tebah 2000.

The ship was scrapped at Alang, India in March 2005, after 46 years of service and 10 names.

References

External links
Bass Strait Passenger Ships
Princess of Tasmania, Ferries of Tasmania

Bass Strait ferries
1958 ships